Super Play Action Football is an American football video game developed by Nintendo for the Super NES. It is the follow-up to NES Play Action Football.

Gameplay

The goal of the game is to obtain the ball and reach the other end of the field to score a touchdown, while avoiding opponent players who can pile onto the character possessing the ball.

If the opponent players do manage to pile onto the character holding the ball, the play stops and the team goes back to the previous line. A quirk in the gameplay allows the defensive player to get an easy sack if they dive with the nose tackle at the precise moment the ball is snapped.

Mario, from the Super Mario Bros. series of video games, makes a cameo in this video game as the "heads" on the coin. The raccoon tail power-up from Super Mario Bros. 3 is the "tails" side of the coin.

Reception
This video game received negative reviews from Total!! UK Magazine (with a 53% overall rating) and the Video Game Critic (with an F rating).

References

1992 video games
College football video games
Nintendo Research & Development 1 games
Play Action Football video games
North America-exclusive video games
Super Nintendo Entertainment System games
Super Nintendo Entertainment System-only games
Top-down video games
Tose (company) games
Video games set in 1992
Video games with isometric graphics
Multiplayer and single-player video games
Video games developed in Japan
Video games scored by Yoshiki Nishimura